Her Stories: African American Folktales, Fairy Tales, and True Tales is a 1995 collection of nineteen stories by Black women, retold by Virginia Hamilton and illustrated by Leo and Diane Dillon. They include animal tales, fairy tales (including a version of Cinderella, "Catskinella"), and three biographical profiles of real Black women. All the stories feature comments on their sources from Hamilton.

Publication history 

 1995, The Blue Sky Press, hardback

Reception 

A review by The Manhattan Mercury called Her Stories "an uplifting book to enjoy and savor for the color and verve of both its language and pictures," drawing particular attention to Leo and Diane Dillons' "stunning and graceful illustrations."

The Des Moines Register praised the collection of tales, noting that they all "vibrate with story-teller spirit" and are "all of a length for perfect bedtime reading."

Awards 

Her Stories has received two awards:

 1995 Laura Ingalls Wilder Award winner
 1996 Coretta Scott King Award author winner

References 

1995 short story collections
1995 children's books
American short story collections
Children's short story collections
Literature by African-American women
Books about African-American history
Collections of fairy tales
Coretta Scott King Award-winning works